Karl Max Barthélémy also known as Karl Max Dany (born 27 October 1986 in N'Djaména) is a Chadian footballer. He has 25 caps for the national team and 2 goals.

Club career

Difaâ El Jadidi
Barthélémy was the best scorer of the Gabonese national championship in 2010, scoring 20 goals. As of 2011, he plays for Difaa El Jadida from Morocco. He signed a 3-year contract. He was best scorer of Moroccan ligue with 17 goals.

PKNP FC
In May 2018, Barthélémy signed a contract with Malaysian team PKNP FC; but days after the signing, an injury suffered in a friendly with the team has him sidelined for more than a month, delaying his official debut for the team.

He made his long-awaited debut for PKNP in the 2018 Malaysia Cup against Pahang, as a substitute, on 18 August 2018.

International career
Barthélémy started playing for the Chad national team in 2007. He played in the 2008 Africa Cup of Nations qualification in a match against Congo, and in the 2010 World Cup qualification, against the same team. In the 2012 Africa Cup of Nations qualification he played matches against Togo both home and away, Botswana away, Tunisia at home, and Malawi both away and at home, where he scored a goal in the dying minutes of the match for a final result 2-2. He played both matches against Tanzania, in a 2014 World Cup qualification, too.

International goals
Scores and results list Chad's goal tally first.

See also
 List of Chad international footballers

References

External links

1988 births
Living people
Chadian footballers
Chad international footballers
Chadian expatriate footballers
Expatriate footballers in Cameroon
Expatriate footballers in Gabon
Expatriate footballers in Morocco
Expatriate footballers in Tunisia
Expatriate footballers in Lebanon
Expatriate footballers in Malaysia
Expatriate footballers in Indonesia
Chadian expatriate sportspeople in Cameroon
Chadian expatriate sportspeople in Gabon
Chadian expatriate sportspeople in Tunisia
Chadian expatriate sportspeople in Morocco
Chadian expatriate sportspeople in Lebanon
Chadian expatriate sportspeople in Malaysia
Chadian expatriate sportspeople in Indonesia
Difaâ Hassani El Jadidi players
Club Africain players
Botola players
CF Mounana players
Nejmeh SC players
Lebanese Premier League players
PKNP FC players
Malaysia Premier League players
Semen Padang F.C. players
Liga 1 (Indonesia) players
People from N'Djamena
Association football forwards